Casbia is a genus of moths in the family Geometridae erected by Francis Walker in 1866.

Species
 Casbia adoxa Turner, 1947
 Casbia albinotata Warren, 1903
 Casbia aviata (Walker, 1861)
 Casbia calliorma Turner, 1919
 Casbia catharodes (Turner, 1904)
 Casbia celidosema Turner, 1947
 Casbia coniodes Turner, 1947
 Casbia crataea Turner, 1939
 Casbia cremnias (Meyrick, 1892)
 Casbia didymosticta Turner, 1947
 Casbia eremias (Meyrick, 1892)
 Casbia eutactopis Turner, 1947
 Casbia farinalis (Rosenstock, 1885)
 Casbia fasciata (Warren, 1896)
 Casbia glaucochroa (Turner, 1906)
 Casbia impressaria (Walker, 1861)
 Casbia leptorrhoda Turner, 1947
 Casbia lithodora (Meyrick, 1892)
 Casbia melanops Rosenstock, 1885
 Casbia ochthadia (Meyrick, 1892)
 Casbia oenias (Meyrick, 1892)
 Casbia pallens Turner, 1947
 Casbia plinthodes Turner, 1947
 Casbia rectaria Walker, 1866
 Casbia rhodoptila Turner, 1919
 Casbia rhodosceles Turner, 1939
 Casbia scardamiata Warren, 1898
 Casbia spodochroa (Turner, 1947)
 Casbia synempora Turner, 1919
 Casbia tanaoctena Turner, 1947

References

Caberini